The 1803 Vermont gubernatorial election for Governor of Vermont took place throughout September, and resulted in the re-election of Isaac Tichenor to a one-year term.

The Vermont General Assembly met in Westminster on October 13. The Vermont House of Representatives appointed a committee to examine the votes of the freemen of Vermont for governor, lieutenant governor, treasurer, and members of the governor's council.

The committee examined the votes, which showed that Isaac Tichenor was chosen for a seventh one-year term. In the election for lieutenant governor, the voters selected Paul Brigham for an eighth one-year term. Benjamin Swan was elected to a fourth one-year term as treasurer. According to contemporary newspaper accounts, the vote totals for governor were as follows.

In the race for lieutenant governor, the vote totals were reported as: Paul Brigham, 7,700; Thomas Leverett, 2,803; Lewis R. Morris, 153; Scattering, 414.

The results for treasurer were: Benjamin Swan, 8,328; Scattering, 353.

Results

References

Vermont gubernatorial elections
gubernatorial
Vermont